Moritz Christian Julius Thaulow (19 November 1812 – 20 July 1850) was a Norwegian chemist.

Thaulow was born in the Duchy of Schleswig to Johan Frederik Thaulow (1768–1833) and Caroline Henriette Tugendreich Looft. He was a brother of Heinrich Arnold Thaulow and Harald Thaulow, and a cousin of Henrik Wergeland and Camilla Collett. In 1839 he married Margreta Elisabeth Juel, and among their children was physician Johan Fredrik Thaulow and Hilda Thaulow, the mother of chemist Axel Aubert.

He studied chemistry in Kiel, and came to Christiania in 1832. After further studies in Copenhagen, Stockholm, Berlin, Giessen and Paris, he returned to the university in Christiania. He was appointed professor in chemistry in 1844.

References

1812 births
1850 deaths
People from the Duchy of Schleswig
Norwegian chemists
Academic staff of the University of Oslo